Raymond Francis Lederer (May 19, 1938 – December 1, 2008) was a Democratic member of the United States House of Representatives, representing Pennsylvania's 3rd congressional district from 1977 to 1981. He was convicted of taking bribes in the 1980 Abscam scandal.

Early life
Lederer was born in Philadelphia on May 19, 1938, where he attended the local Catholic schools, graduating from Roman Catholic High School for Boys in 1956. He attended Saint Joseph's College of Philadelphia (now Saint Joseph's University) from 1960 to 1965, the Community College of Philadelphia from 1967 to 1969 and Pennsylvania State University, University Park, Pennsylvania, in 1972. He worked as an assistant engineer for the Pennsylvania Department of Highways in 1957. He was a probation officer and later served as director of the Philadelphia Probation Department, during the period from 1967 to 1974. Lederer was a board member of the Pennsylvania Committee on Probation.

Politics
Lederer was elected to the Pennsylvania House of Representatives, where he served from 1974 to 1977. Lederer represented the same part of Philadelphia that had been served by both his father, Miles, and older brother, William. His sister-in-law, Marie, would also go on to serve in the State House.

Congress
Lederer was elected to Congress in 1976 to represent ; Lederer won with 73% of the vote, defeating Republican candidate Terence J. Schade. He took office on January 3, 1977. While serving on the House Ways and Means Committee, he was able to direct shipments of fruit from Chile to be imported through the Port of Philadelphia.

Lederer was re-elected in 1978 with almost 72% of the vote over Republican Raymond S. Kauffman.

Abscam
Lederer was videotaped at a motel in New York on September 11, 1979, at a meeting with two undercover agents who presented themselves as representatives of a supposed Arab sheik. Accepting $50,000 in cash, he told the agents "I can give you me" in exchange for the money.

After being implicated in the Abscam sting, Lederer was convicted of bribery on January 9, 1981, and sentenced to three years in prison and fined $20,000. Despite his indictment in the scandal, Lederer was re-elected, unlike the other members of the House implicated in the Abscam scandal. In the 1980 race, Lederer won with 54.5% of the vote, defeating Republican William J. Phillips, who had 32.8%, Consumer Party candidate Max Weiner with 9.5% and Independent John Morris with 3.2%.

The United States House Committee on Standards of Official Conduct voted to expel him on April 28, 1981. Lederer resigned the following day, citing "personal legal problems" that interfered with his ability to serve his constituents. Joseph F. Smith ran in the Democratic Party primary in a race to succeed Lederer in a special election. After losing in the primary to David B. Glancey, chairman of the Democratic City Committee, Smith ran in the July 1981 special election as both an Independent and as a Republican (with the approval of the Republican Party) and defeated Glancey, having promised in his campaign to caucus with the Democrats if elected.

Lederer served ten months in Allenwood Federal Prison. He later worked as a roofer. Lederer died on December 1, 2008, of lung cancer at age 70 and is interred at the Holy Sepulchre Cemetery in Cheltenham, Pennsylvania.

See also
 List of American federal politicians convicted of crimes
 List of federal political scandals in the United States

References

External links

|-

1938 births
2008 deaths
20th-century American politicians
Abscam
Burials at Holy Sepulchre Cemetery
Deaths from lung cancer in Pennsylvania
Democratic Party members of the United States House of Representatives from Pennsylvania
Democratic Party members of the Pennsylvania House of Representatives
Pennsylvania politicians convicted of crimes
Pennsylvania State University alumni
Politicians convicted of bribery under 18 U.S.C. § 201
Politicians convicted of conspiracy to defraud the United States
Pennsylvania politicians convicted of corruption
Politicians convicted of illegal gratuities under 18 U.S.C. § 201
Politicians convicted under the Travel Act
Politicians from Philadelphia
Saint Joseph's University alumni
Prisoners and detainees of the United States federal government